Brigadier Thomas James Bolle Bosvile,  (19 September 1897 – 8 July 1945) was a British Army  officer who served as acting General Officer Commanding 1st Armoured Division during the Second World War.

Military career
Bosvile was commissioned into the Rifle Brigade (The Prince Consort's Own) on 16 June 1915. He saw action during the First World War for which he was awarded the Military Cross.

During the Second World War, he commanded the 1st Battalion, The Rifle Brigade during the Battle of Gazala in North Africa in May 1942 for which he was appointed a Companion of the Distinguished Service Order. He went on to command 7th Motor Brigade and led the Defence of Outpost Snipe on 26 October 1942 during the Second Battle of El Alamein in October 1942: for this he was awarded a bar to his Distinguished Service Order. He briefly served as acting General Officer Commanding 1st Armoured Division from 27 April 1943 until 1 May 1943. After that he served on the staff at the Supreme Headquarters Allied Expeditionary Force for which he was appointed a Commander of the Order of the British Empire. 

He died on 8 July 1945, before the end of the war and was buried at Church of St Andrew & St Mary, Pitminster.

Family
Bosvile married Crystal Guina Lucy Jervis on 11 October 1927.

References

External links
Generals of World War II

1897 births
1945 deaths
Commanders of the Order of the British Empire
Companions of the Distinguished Service Order
Recipients of the Military Cross
Rifle Brigade officers
British Army brigadiers of World War II
War Office personnel in World War II
British Army personnel of World War I